The Tannery River is a river in North Attleboro and Attleboro, Massachusetts. There is one dam along its length.

Course
The river begins as a series of small streams and swamps in North Attleboro, between Emerald Mall to the east and the Cumberland, RI border to the west. From there it flows south, picks up flow from Benjamin's Brook and crosses the border into Attleboro. There it receives Como Brook before reaching the SevenMile River just north of the Rhode Island border.

Tributaries
Benjamin's Brook and Como Brook are the only tributaries, though it has several streams that also feed it.

References
Maps from the United States Geological Survey

Rivers of Massachusetts
Bodies of water of Bristol County, Massachusetts
Tributaries of Providence River